Raghunath Singh Chauhan is an Indian politician and member of the Bharatiya Janata Party from Uttarakhand. He is former MLA in the Uttarakhand Legislative Assembly representing Almora constituency. Previously Chauhan had been a member of the Uttar Pradesh Legislative Assembly from the Almora constituency in Almora district at the time when Almora was part of Uttar Pradesh.
He was the deputy speaker of fourth Uttarkhand Legislative Assembly.

References 

People from Almora district
Bharatiya Janata Party politicians from Uttarakhand
Deputy Speakers of the Uttar Pradesh Legislative Assembly
Living people
Uttarakhand MLAs 2017–2022
Year of birth missing (living people)